Vision Macau (Associação Visão de Macau) is a political party in the Chinese Special Administrative Region of Macau. Macau is a state in which political parties don't play a role. Though some civic groups put forward lists at the elections and might be considered parties. At the last elections in Macau, 25 September 2005, the group won 1.6% of the popular vote and 0 out of 12 popular elected seats.

See also
 Politics of Macau

Political parties in Macau